William Marks (Pennsylvania politician) (1778–1858) was a U.S. Senator from Pennsylvania from 1825 to 1831, and also served in the Pennsylvania State Senate. Senator Marks may also refer to:

Bruce Marks (born 1957), Pennsylvania State Senate
Milton Marks (1920–1998), California State Senate